<noinclude>

Champaign County is a county in the U.S. state of Illinois. As of the 2020 census, its population was 205,865, making it the 10th-most populous county in Illinois. Its county seat is Urbana.

Champaign County is part of the Champaign–Urbana, IL Metropolitan Statistical Area. The twin cities of Urbana and Champaign are the only cities in the county, and they nearly surround the campus of the University of Illinois Urbana–Champaign.

History
Champaign County was organized in 1833, having been previously a part of Vermilion County. The development of the county was greatly furthered by the arrival of the Chicago Branch of the Illinois Central Railroad, and even more by the establishment of the land-grant university. Later, the county also got an airport and a mass transit district. The northern part of the county experienced an economic and demographic setback with the closing of Chanute Air Training Center in the 1990s. In the 2004 Presidential election, it was one of only 15 of the 102 Illinois counties where John Kerry received a majority of the vote (50.37%).

Geography
It is the fifth-largest county in Illinois by land area.

Because Champaign County is situated on a large and very flat plateau, it had virtually no natural drainage, so that much of the County consisted of wetlands until drainage ditches were built, beginning in the 1870s. This was an example of an upland marsh, which resulted in a high incidence of malaria before the late nineteenth century.

The topography of Champaign County was formed by the Wisconsin Glacier about 20,000 years before the present. Lobes of ice from what is now Lake Michigan crossed the county, creating a deep pile of glacial soil, up to 300 feet thick, topped by numerous moraines forming small, flat watersheds with no outlets.

Champaign County is situated on the divide between the Ohio and Mississippi Rivers. Rivers flow out of Champaign County to the east, west, and south. The Kaskaskia River has its origin to the northwest of Champaign, draining the western side of that City. The Kaskaskia flows toward the southwest, joining the Mississippi south of St. Louis, Missouri.

The Embarras River, on the other hand, drains the south-central portion of the Champaign–Urbana metropolitan area, originating in southeastern Champaign and flowing through the experimental fields on the southern part of the campus of the University of Illinois. The  is a tributary to the Wabash River and Ohio River systems. The northeast corner of Champaign, the central portion of the University campus, and the northern part of Urbana are drained by the Boneyard Creek, which flows into the Saline Ditch, a tributary of the Vermilion and Wabash rivers.

Adjacent counties
 McLean County – northwest
 Ford County – north
 Vermilion County – east
 Edgar County – southeast
 Douglas County – south
 Piatt County – west

Transportation

Major highways

  Interstate 57
  Interstate 72
  Interstate 74
  US Route 45
  US Route 136
  US Route 150
  Illinois Route 10
  Illinois Route 47
  Illinois Route 49
  Illinois Route 54
  Illinois Route 130

Airports
The following public-use airports are located in the county:
 University of Illinois Willard Airport (CMI) – Champaign–Urbana
 Rantoul National Aviation Center (Frank Elliott Field) (TIP) – Rantoul
 Frasca Field (C16) – Urbana

Rail
There are two train stations in Champaign County: The Illinois Terminal in downtown Champaign and Rantoul station in Rantoul. Both stations are served by the Amtrak Illini and Saluki trains, which operate once daily between Chicago and Carbondale. The Illinois Terminal is also served by the City of New Orleans, which operates once daily between Chicago and New Orleans. Amtrak passenger trains in Champaign County use the former Illinois Central mainline, which is owned by the Canadian National Railway and also used by freight trains.

The Norfolk Southern Railway operates two branch lines in Champaign County: the Mansfield Line from Urbana to Mansfield and the Lafayette District from Decatur to Peru, Indiana. Canadian National also operates branch lines from Champaign to Seymour and Rantoul to Dewey. Traffic on the branch lines is limited and consists primarily of freight.

Intercity Buses

Amtrak, Greyhound, and Peoria Charter operate intercity buses from Champaign-Urbana to Chicago, St. Louis, Indianapolis, and other destinations.

Public Transit
The Champaign-Urbana Mass Transit District operates public city buses in Champaign, Urbana, and Savoy.

Renewable energy
In August 2018, the Champaign County Board voted to approve solar farms on certain agricultural properties. Solar farms produce photovoltaic energy, which is energy produced by cells that generate electricity when they are hit by light. The board approved solar farms in AG-1 and AG-2 agricultural zoning districts. In order to make the solar farms, developers must obtain a special permit from the county board first. At least seven applications for permits were submitted in the first month.

Climate and weather

Demographics

As of the 2010 census, there were 201,081 people, 80,665 households, and 42,737 families residing in the county. The racial makeup of the county was 73.4% white, 12.4% black or African American, 8.9% Asian, 0.3% American Indian, 0.1% Pacific islander, 2.2% from other races, and 2.7% from two or more races. Those of Hispanic or Latino origin made up 5.3% of the population. In terms of ancestry, 23.9% were German, 12.2% were Irish, 11.5% were American, and 8.9% were English.

Of the 80,665 households, 25.8% had children under the age of 18 living with them, 39.7% were married couples living together, 9.9% had a female householder with no husband present, 47.0% were non-families, and 33.2% of all households were made up of individuals. The average household size was 2.29 and the average family size was 2.95. The median age was 28.9 years.

The median income for a household in the county was $45,262 and the median income for a family was $65,785. Males had a median income of $45,823 versus $35,321 for females. The per capita income for the county was $24,553. About 9.7% of families and 20.5% of the population were below the poverty line, including 20.2% of those under age 18 and 8.3% of those age 65 or over.

The Champaign County Economic Development Corporation (CHCEDC) produced a 2009 County Demographic Profile which includes information on the population, labor, housing, cost of living, education, taxes, retail sales, transportation, quality of life, utilities. CHCEDC also conducts labor force studies every two years and labor shed studies every few years.

Economy
Supported by the University of Illinois, through backings such as the Research Park, and Champaign County leaders, the area has shown even more growth in Information Technology, Micro/Nanotechnology, Bio-Imaging, Healthcare, Logistics, Distribution, and Agribusiness in recent years.

The Top 2009 Employers of the county are the University of Illinois, Carle Clinic Association, Carle Foundation Hospital, Champaign Schools Unit 4, Kraft Foods, Provena Covenant Medical, Parkland College, Kirby Foods, Christie Clinic Association, Urbana Schools District, and Hobbico.

Communities

Cities
 Champaign (largest city)
 Urbana (county seat)

Villages

 Bondville
 Broadlands
 Fisher
 Foosland
 Gifford
 Homer
 Ivesdale
 Longview
 Ludlow
 Mahomet
 Ogden
 Pesotum
 Philo
 Rantoul
 Royal
 Sadorus
 Savoy
 Sidney
 St. Joseph
 Thomasboro
 Tolono

Townships

 Ayers
 Brown
 Champaign
 Champaign City
 Colfax
 Compromise
 Condit
 Crittenden
 Cunningham
 East Bend
 Harwood
 Hensley
 Kerr
 Ludlow
 Mahomet
 Newcomb
 Ogden
 Pesotum
 Philo
 Rantoul
 Raymond
 Sadorus
 Scott
 Sidney
 Somer
 South Homer
 St. Joseph
 Stanton
 Tolono
 Urbana

Census-designated places
 Lake of the Woods
 Penfield
 Seymour

Other unincorporated places

 Augerville
 Block
 Bongard
 Dailey
 Deers
 Dewey
 Dickerson
 Dillsburg
 Flatville
 Fulls
 Gerald
 Giblin
 Glover
 Jimtown
 Leverett
 Lotus
 Mayview
 Mira
 Parkville
 Pauline
 Prospect
 Rising
 Rutherford
 Sellers
 Staley
 State Road
 Tipton
 Tomlinson
 Wilbur Heights

Politics
Like most of central Illinois, Champaign County was powerfully Republican between the Civil War and the latter portion of the 20th century. From 1856 to 1988, it only supported a Democrat three times, in the national Democratic landslides of 1932, 1936 and 1964. Pockets of Democratic support existed in the cities of Champaign and Urbana, which frequently sent Democrats to the Illinois House of Representatives.

Since 1992, Champaign County has been one of the few Democratic bastions in central Illinois, and has become one of the most Democratic counties in downstate Illinois. It has supported a Democrat in the last eight presidential elections, and since 2004 has given a majority to Democratic candidates. This tracks closely with the strong Democratic trend in other counties influenced by college towns since the 1990s. The county's more rural precincts are still heavily Republican, however, they are no match for Champaign and Urbana, which account for over 60 percent of the county's population. George H. W. Bush in 1988 was the last Republican to carry the county, and Barack Obama's 2008 performance was the best by a Democrat until Joe Biden's 2020 performance surpassed it. Donald Trump had a particularly poor showing in the county in 2016, receiving a little over 35% of the vote, his third-worst showing in the state and his worst outside the Chicago area.

Education
Here is a list of K-12 school districts with territory in the county, no matter how slight, even if the districts have their schools and/or administrative offices in other counties:

K-12:
 Arthur Community Unit School District 305
 Bement Community Unit School District 5
 Champaign Community Unit School District 4
 Fisher Community Unit School District 1
 Gibson City-Melvin-Sibley Community Unit School District 5
 Heritage Community Unit School District 8
 Mahomet-Seymour Community Unit School District 3
 Monticello Community Unit School District 25
 Paxton-Buckley-Loda Community Unit School District 10
 Tolono Community Unit School District 7
 Tuscola Community Unit School District 301
 Urbana School District 116
 Villa Grove Community Unit School District 302

Secondary:
 Armstrong Township High School District 225
 Rantoul Township High School District 193
 St. Joseph-Ogden Community High School District 305

Elementary:
 Armstrong-Ellis Consolidated School District 61
 Gifford Community Consolidated School District 188
 Ludlow Community Consolidated School District 142
 Prairieview-Ogden Community Consolidated School District 197
 Rantoul City School District 137
 St. Joseph Community Consolidated School District 169
 Thomasboro Community Consolidated School District 130

University of Illinois is in the county.

See also

 National Register of Historic Places listings in Champaign County, Illinois

References

Bibliography

External links
 Champaign County Official Page
 Champaign County Visitors Information
 Champaign County Economic Development Corporation
 United States Census Bureau 2007 TIGER/Line Shapefiles
 United States Board on Geographic Names (GNIS)
 United States National Atlas
 Book of the Champaign County Courthouse dedication from 1901

 
Illinois counties
1833 establishments in Illinois
Populated places established in 1833